Slemdal is a station on the Holmenkollen Line of the Oslo Metro. It is served by Line 1 from Frognerseteren to Helsfyr/Bergkrystallen. It was opened on 31 May, 1898 as a tram station on the Holmenkoll Line from Majorstuen to Besserud

References

External links

List of Holmenkoll Line stations

Oslo Metro stations in Oslo
Railway stations opened in 1898
1898 establishments in Norway